Davis Township is one of eleven townships in Fountain County, Indiana, United States. As of the 2010 census, its population was 682 and it contained 286 housing units.

Geography
It contains no incorporated settlements but four unincorporated ones. Both Maysville Crossing and Riverside lie in the northwest part of the township along the Norfolk Southern Railway line; Riverside is across the Wabash River from Independence in neighboring Warren County. Roberts is in the eastern part of the township, and Vine is near the center. There is a naturally occurring hollow in the Township known as Possum Holler. It's a ready-made weather break for those who live there and a lovely drive for those passing through. The area is rich in a wide variety of indigenous flora and fauna. Many locals refuse to live anywhere else calling the Holler home for generations

Indiana State Road 28 crosses the south part of the township from east to west. Indiana State Road 341 begins at State Road 28 and runs south.

Cemeteries
The township contains Maysville Cemetery, to the southwest of Maysville Crossing. Salem Cemetery is also within Davis Township and is located southeast of the location marked Vine but north of State Rd 28.

References

 
 United States Census Bureau cartographic boundary files

External links
 Indiana Township Association
 United Township Association of Indiana

Townships in Fountain County, Indiana
Townships in Indiana